Eil may refer to:

Places 
 Eil (crater), on Mars
 Eil, Cologne, a quarter of Cologne, Germany
 Eil, Somalia
 Eil District, Somalia
 Loch Eil, a lake in Scotland

Other uses 
 Eastern Independent League, an American high school sports conference
 Eielson Air Force Base, near Fairbanks, Alaska
 Energy input labeling
 Engineers India Limited
 English as an International Language
 Eurostar International Limited, European company, operating high-speed international rail services
 Experiment in International Living
 Peter Eil (1917–1965), German soldier during World War II
 VR Class Eil, a Finnish railway coach